Moacyr Cordeiro, simply known as Biguá (22 March 1921 – 1 January 1989), was a Brazilian footballer.

Born in Irati, Paraná, the defensive midfielder started his career in 1939 at FC Água Verde. In 1941 he signed with Flamengo, in which he stayed until the end of his career in 1953. Bigua died on January 9, 1989, in Rio de Janeiro.

References

External links
Profile at Museu dos Esportes

Brazilian footballers
1921 births
1989 deaths
CR Flamengo footballers
Association football midfielders
Sportspeople from Paraná (state)